Mormodes, abbreviated as Morm. in the horticultural trade, is a genus of approximately 70-80 species of terrestrial and epiphytic orchids native to Mexico, Central America and South America.

List of species 

 Mormodes andicola Salazar, Orquídea (Mexico City),1992
 Mormodes andreettae Dodson, 1982
 Mormodes aromatica Lindl., 1841
 Mormodes atropurpurea Lindl., 1836
 Mormodes aurantiaca Schltr., 1925
 Mormodes aurea L.C.Menezes & Tadaiesky, 1997
 Mormodes auriculata F.E.L.Miranda, 1989
 Mormodes badia Rolfe ex W.Watson, 1897
 Mormodes buccinator Lindl., 1840
 Mormodes calceolata Fowlie, 1972
 Mormodes carnevaliana Salazar & G.A.Romero, 1994
 Mormodes cartonii Hook., 1846
 Mormodes castroi Salazar, 1993
 Mormodes chrysantha Salazar, 1993
 Mormodes claesiana Pabst, 1968
 Mormodes cogniauxii L.Linden, 1894
 Mormodes colossus Rchb.f., 1852
 Mormodes cozticxochitl Salazar, 1990
 Mormodes cucumerina Pabst, 1972
 Mormodes dasilvae Salazar, 1993
 Mormodes densiflora F.E.L.Miranda, 1989
 Mormodes elegans F.E.L.Miranda, 1989
 Mormodes ephippilabia Fowlie, 1964
 Mormodes escobarii Pabst, 1969
 Mormodes estradae Dodson, 1980
 Mormodes fractiflexa Rchb.f., 1872
 Mormodes frymirei Dodson, 1980
 Mormodes guentheriana (Kraenzl.) Mansf., 1932
 Mormodes hoehnei F.E.L.Miranda & K.G.Lacerda, 1992
 Mormodes hookeri Lem., 1851
 Mormodes horichii Fowlie, 1964
 Mormodes ignea Lindl. & Paxton, 1852
 Mormodes issanensis F.E.L.Miranda & K.G.Lacerda, 1992
 Mormodes lancilabris Pabst, 1975
 Mormodes lawrenceana Rolfe, 1890
 Mormodes lineata Bateman ex Lindl., 1841
 Mormodes lobulata Schltr., Repert. 1910
 Mormodes luxata Lindl., 1842
 Mormodes maculata (Klotzsch) L.O.Williams, 1950
 Mormodes mejiae Pabst, 1974
 Mormodes morenoi R.Vásquez & Dodson, 1998
 Mormodes nagelii L.O.Williams, 1940
 Mormodes oberlanderiana F.Lehm. & Kraenzl., 1900
 Mormodes ocanae Linden & Rchb.f. in W.G.Walpers, 1863
 Mormodes oceloteoides S.Rosillo, 1983
 Mormodes oestlundianum Salazar & Hágsater, 1990
 Mormodes orinocoensis Salazar & G.A.Romero, 1994
 Mormodes pabstiana J.Cardeñas, A.Ramírez & S.Rosillo, 1983
 Mormodes paraensis Salazar & da Silva, 1993
 Mormodes pardalinata S.Rosillo, 1979
 Mormodes peruviana Salazar, 1993
 Mormodes porphyrophlebia Salazar, 1992
 Mormodes powellii Schltr., 1922
 Mormodes ramirezii S.Rosillo, 1983
 Mormodes rodriguesiana Salazar, 1992
 Mormodes rolfeana L.Linden, 1891
 Mormodes romanii Dodson, 1980
 Mormodes rosea Barb.Rodr., 1877
 Mormodes saccata S.Rosillo, 1983
 Mormodes sanguineoclaustra Fowlie, 1970
 Mormodes schultzei Schltr., 1924
 Mormodes sinuata Rchb.f. & Warm. in H.G.Reichenbach, 1881
 Mormodes skinneri Rchb.f., 1869
 Mormodes sotoana Salazar, Orquídea (Mexico City), 1992
 Mormodes speciosa Linden ex Lindl. & Paxton, 1853
 Mormodes tapoayensis F.E.L.Miranda & K.G.Lacerda, 1992
 Mormodes tezontle S.Rosillo, Orquídea (Mexico City), 1980
 Mormodes tibicen Rchb.f., 1870
 Mormodes tigrina Barb.Rodr., 1877
 Mormodes tuxtlensis Salazar, 1988
 Mormodes uncia Rchb.f., 1869
 Mormodes variabilis Rchb.f., 1869
 Mormodes vernixioidea Pabst, 1975
 Mormodes vernixium Rchb.f., 1887
 Mormodes vinacea Hoehne, 1910
 Mormodes warszewiczii Klotzsch, 1854

References 

  (1836) A Natural System of Botany 446.
  (Eds)  (2009) Genera Orchidacearum Volume 5: Epidendroideae (Part 2): Epidendroideae, 35 ff. Oxford: Oxford University Press.

External links 

 
Catasetinae genera
Epiphytic orchids